S. Senthilkumar is an Indian politician and a former member of the Tamil Nadu Legislative Assembly from the Thiruverumbur constituency. He represents the Desiya Murpokku Dravidar Kazhagam party.

References 

Living people
Members of the Tamil Nadu Legislative Assembly
Desiya Murpokku Dravida Kazhagam politicians
Year of birth missing (living people)
Place of birth missing (living people)